Walnut Ridge Air Force Station (ADC ID: SM-143) is a closed United States Air Force General Surveillance Radar station. It was closed in 1963.

History
Walnut Ridge Air Force Station was initially part of Phase II of the Air Defense Command Mobile Radar program. The Air Force  approved this expansion of the Mobile Radar program on 23 October 1952.  Radars in this network were designated "SM."

The United States Air Force Air Defense Command established a Mobile Radar site at Walnut Ridge Regional Airport in 1956, designating it Walnut Ridge Air Force Station, and designating it as SM-143. The 725th Aircraft Control and Warning Squadron was assigned to Walnut Ridge AFS from Tinker AFB, OK on 1 July and began operating an AN/MPS-11 radar set at the station.  Initially the station functioned as a Ground-Control Intercept (GCI) and warning station.  As a GCI station, the squadron's role was to guide interceptor aircraft toward unidentified intruders picked up on the unit's radar scopes.

In 1958 an AN/FPS-6 replaced the AN/FPS-4 height-finder radar that had been installed a year earlier, and a second AN/FPS-6 was added subsequently. During 1962 Walnut Ridge AFS joined the Semi Automatic Ground Environment (SAGE) system, feeding data to DC-07 at Truax Field, Wisconsin.  After joining, the squadron was re-designated as the 725th Radar Squadron (SAGE) on 1 May 1962. The radar squadron provided information 24/7 the SAGE Direction Center where it was analyzed to determine range, direction altitude speed and whether or not aircraft were friendly or hostile.

In March 1963 the Air Force ordered this site to close. Operations ceased on 1 August 1963 and the 725th Radar Squadron was inactivated.

With its closure, Walnut Ridge was determined to be excess by the military and turned over to the local government for civil use.  Today, the Air Force radar site is part of the civil airport (formerly Marine Corps Air Facility Walnut Ridge), and the Williams Baptist College. Most of the USAF buildings are still in use, some by the college and some by Southwest Airlines, which has established a training facility at the site.

Air Force units and assignments

Units
 725th Aircraft Control and Warning Squadron, activated at Tinker AFB, Oklahoma, 8 April 1955
 Moved to Walnut Ridge Air Force Station, 1 July 1956
 Redesignated 725th Radar Squadron (SAGE), 1 May 1962
 Discontinued, 1 August 1963

Assignments
 33d Air Division, 8 April 1955
 20th Air Division, 1 March 1956
 Kansas City Air Defense Sector, 1 January 1960
 Chicago Air Defense Sector, 1 July 1961 – 1 August 1963

See also
 List of USAF Aerospace Defense Command General Surveillance Radar Stations

References

  A Handbook of Aerospace Defense Organization 1946 - 1980,  by Lloyd H. Cornett and Mildred W. Johnson, Office of History, Aerospace Defense Center, Peterson Air Force Base, Colorado
 Winkler, David F. (1997), Searching the skies: the legacy of the United States Cold War defense radar program. Prepared for United States Air Force Headquarters Air Combat Command.
 Information for Walnut Ridge AFS, AR

Installations of the United States Air Force in Arkansas
Semi-Automatic Ground Environment sites
Aerospace Defense Command military installations
Buildings and structures in Lawrence County, Arkansas
1956 establishments in Arkansas
1963 disestablishments in Arkansas
Military installations established in 1956
Military installations closed in 1963